Elections were held in the state of Western Australia on 19 February 1983 to elect all 57 members to the Legislative Assembly and 18 members to the 34-seat Legislative Council.

The three-term Liberal-National Country coalition government, led by Premier Ray O'Connor since 25 January 1982 (after the retirement of Sir Charles Court) was defeated by the Labor Party, led by Opposition Leader Brian Burke since 10 September 1981.

Results

Legislative Assembly

|}

Notes:
 754,226 electors were enrolled to vote at the election, but one seat, Narrogin, held by the National Country Party's Peter Jones and representing 9,239 electors, was held unopposed.
 The National Country Party (NCP) and the National Party (NP) were two separate parties, the former in coalition with the Liberal Party, the latter an independent party which had split from the NCP on 10 August 1978.

Legislative Council

|}

Seats changing parties

 Members listed in italics did not contest their seat at this election.
 * figure is vs. Liberal
 ** figure is vs. National (NP)

Post-election pendulum

Opinion polling

See also
 Candidates of the 1983 Western Australian state election
 Members of the Western Australian Legislative Assembly, 1980–1983
 Members of the Western Australian Legislative Assembly, 1983–1986

References

Elections in Western Australia
1983 elections in Australia
1980s in Western Australia
February 1983 events in Australia